Siping East railway station  is a railway station on the Harbin–Dalian section of the Beijing–Harbin High-Speed Railway. It is in Siping, Jilin province, China. It is one of two railway stations in the city, the other being Siping railway station.

See also

Chinese Eastern Railway
South Manchuria Railway
South Manchuria Railway Zone
Changchun Light Rail Transit

References

Buildings and structures in Jilin
Transport in Jilin
Railway stations in Jilin